PT Astra Honda Motor is a motorcycle manufacturer based in Jakarta, Indonesia. It is a joint venture between Honda and Astra International (with a 50% stake each).

History
Astra Honda Motor was formed in 1971 as PT. Federal Motor with the assembly of Honda motorcycles. At the same time, it took over as the sole agency.

In 2000, the Astra Honda Motor joint venture was agreed between Honda and Astra International, which began operations in January 2001. According to another source, the new company was a merger between PT. Federal Motor and PT. Honda Federal.

Ten million Honda motorcycles were manufactured in Indonesia by 2003.

In 2004 and 2005, Honda built a third plant in Bekasi. In March 2015, the company opened a fourth plant in Karawang. With a production capacity of 5.3 million motorcycles, Astra Honda Motor is the world's largest manufacturer of Honda motorcycles.

At the beginning of 2015, around 22,400 people were employed at AHM.

Honda has a very large market share in Indonesia, for example 73% in the first half of 2016. The Indonesian market for motorcycles is one of the largest in Southeast Asia with more than 7 million units.

Current models 
Excluding ≥250 cc motorcycles/scooters
 Standard motorcycles
 Honda CB150 Verza
 Honda CB150R Streetfire
 Honda CB150X
 Honda Monkey (imported)

 Sport motorcycles
 Honda CBR150R
 Honda CBR250RR

 Dual-sport motorcycles
 Honda CRF150L
 Honda CRF250L (imported)

 Underbones
 Honda Revo
 Honda Supra X 125
 Honda Supra GTR 150
 Honda Sonic 150R
 Honda Super Cub C125 (imported)
 Honda CT125 (imported)
  Honda ST125 Dax (imported) 

 Scooters
 Honda BeAT
 Honda Genio
 Honda Scoopy
 Honda Vario
 Honda PCX
 Honda ADV 
 Honda Forza (imported)

References

Honda
Manufacturing companies based in Jakarta
Vehicle manufacturing companies established in 1971
Indonesian companies established in 1971
Motorcycle manufacturers of Indonesia